Berkeley Zen Center (BZC), temple name , is an Sōtō Zen Buddhist practice centre located in Berkeley, California currently led by Hozan Alan Senauke. An informal affiliate to the San Francisco Zen Center (SFZC), BZC was founded in 1967 by Sojun Mel Weitsman and Shunryu Suzuki as a satellite group for the SFZC. Despite founding the centre, Weitsman was not installed as an abbot there until 1985, one year after receiving Dharma transmission from Hoitsu Suzuki. Weitsman's Dharma heir, Alan Senauke, lives on-site with his wife Laurie Senauke (as of 1999) and also works for the Buddhist Peace Fellowship. Another former teacher at BZC was Maylie Scott, who died in 2001. In 1969 Zenkei Blanche Hartman began sitting zazen at BZC, receiving Dharma transmission from Weitsman in 1988. In 1979 the centre relocated to its current location on Russell Street—and today houses a small group of residents who live on site. BZC has an active community and a full schedule of zen service, student talks, dharma talks, and zazen.

Gallery

See also
Buddhism in the United States
Timeline of Zen Buddhism in the United States

Notes

References

Zen centers in California
Culture of Berkeley, California
Religious organizations established in 1967
Buddhism in the San Francisco Bay Area
Buddhist temples in Berkeley